Carnaval Eletrônico is the seventh studio album by Brazilian singer Daniela Mercury, released on June 10, 2004 on BMG Brazil.

Track listing

References 

2004 albums
Daniela Mercury albums
Sony Music Brazil albums